Johanna Hargreaves (born 18 June 1963) is a British television actress who has been active since 1980, best known for playing "Stella" in the 1983 teenage drama Johnny Jarvis and "Linda Jordan" in the 1992 police drama Between the Lines.

Selected filmography
Sense & Sensibility (2008) - Servant
Doctors (2002) - Joy Beeching
The Bill (1990–1998) Julie Watson
No Bananas (1996) - Phyllis Slater
Between the Lines (1992) - Linda Jordan
Casualty (1986–1990) - Debbie Bannister
Bergerac (1990) - June Marks
Red Dwarf (1988) - Esperanto Woman
Slinger's Day (1986) - Marilyn
A Little Princess (1986 miniseries) - HenriettaHazard of Hearts (1987) - Young MaidFilthy Rich & Catflap (1987) - Cindy (1 episode, 1987)Shine on Harvey Moon (1985) - HildaTenko (1984) - CherryThe Glory Boys (1984) -  WendyJohnny Jarvis (1983) - StellaTake the High Road'' (1980) - Sandra Blair

External links
 

English television actresses
1963 births
Living people